Apache is a video game released by Digital Integration in 1995 for DOS and Macintosh. The game is a combat flight simulation of the American AH-64D Apache Longbow helicopter. A successor, Hind, was released in 1996.

Gameplay
In campaign mode, the player can choose which 3 areas to enter in a tour of duty. The campaign mode also plays video clips and has a briefing before any mission. The player is given a choice of ordnance, and is able to zoom in on the mission map, giving them a satellite view of the area or target and meteorological data.

Reception

Apache was a commercial success, with global sales above 200,000 units by February 1996. More than 120,000 of these sales derived from the United States.

A reviewer for Next Generation called the game "a stunningly realistic simulation of one of the most complex military aircrafts of all time". He complimented the effectiveness of the polygon graphics, the selection of modes for network and modem play, the extreme realism of the flight simulation, and the balance and ingenuity of the scenario designs. He gave it five out of five stars.

Apache was named the best simulation of 1995 by PC Gamer US and—tying with Flight Unlimited—Computer Games Strategy Plus. PC Gamer USs editors wrote, "With all of its difficulty and realism options cranked up to maximum, Apache can be played as a hard-core simulation of the world's best attack helicopter, [... and] novice air-combat pilots — or those who simply enjoy a good shoot-'em-up — can reduce the difficulty level until Apache plays like a fast-paced, no-holds-barred arcade-action game."

References

External links
 
 http://www.gamespot.com/reviews/apache-review/1900-2538013/
 https://web.archive.org/web/19980215035035/http://www.machome.com/GameGuide/Simulations.html
 https://archive.org/stream/powerplaymagazine-1995-07/PowerPlay_07_1995#page/n39/mode/2up/

1995 video games
DOS games
Combat flight simulators
Games commercially released with DOSBox
Helicopter video games
Classic Mac OS games
Multiplayer and single-player video games
Video games scored by Richard Joseph
Video games developed in the United Kingdom
Video games set in Cyprus
Video games set in Yemen
Video games set in Korea
Windows games